William Duckworth (October 25, 1884 – November 8, 1951) was an Ontario merchant and political figure. He represented Dovercourt in the Legislative Assembly of Ontario from 1934 to 1948 as a Conservative and then Progressive Conservative member.

He was born in Garafraxa Township, Dufferin County, Ontario, the son of Samuel Duckworth, and was educated in Orangeville. He was a farmer in Luther Township for some time before moving to Toronto where he established a wholesale produce business. In 1908, he married a Miss Taylor. Duckworth served on the city council for several years and was a member of the Orange Order.

References 

 Canadian Parliamentary Guide, 1947, PG Normandin

External links 

History of Dufferin County, S. Sawden (1952)

1884 births
1951 deaths
Canadian Baptists
Progressive Conservative Party of Ontario MPPs
20th-century Baptists